Echo Valley Ski Area is a small ski area located near Chelan, Washington, United States.

External links
 Echo Valley Ski Area Website

Buildings and structures in Chelan County, Washington
Ski areas and resorts in Washington (state)
Tourist attractions in Chelan County, Washington